Michael Andrew Yastrzemski (born August 23, 1990), nicknamed "Yaz", is an American professional baseball outfielder for the San Francisco Giants of Major League Baseball (MLB). He is the grandson of Hall of Famer and Triple Crown winner Carl Yastrzemski. Yastrzemski played college baseball for the Vanderbilt Commodores. The Baltimore Orioles selected him in the 14th round of the 2013 MLB draft. He made his MLB debut with the Giants in 2019.

Early life
Yastrzemski attended St. John's Preparatory School in Danvers, Massachusetts. He played for the school's baseball team, and was named team captain in his senior year. He committed to attend Vanderbilt University, on a college baseball scholarship. Seen as a potential early round selection in the 2009 Major League Baseball (MLB) draft, Yastrzemski indicated that he would attend college unless chosen in the first round. The Boston Red Sox selected him in the 36th round (1,098th overall) of the draft. Yastrzemski did not sign with the Red Sox, and instead enrolled at Vanderbilt to play for the Vanderbilt Commodores baseball team.

College career
Yastrzemski became a starter for the Commodores in the middle of his freshman year. In 2010 and 2011, he played collegiate summer baseball with the Cotuit Kettleers of the Cape Cod Baseball League. After his junior year, the Seattle Mariners selected him in the 30th round (911th overall) of the 2012 MLB draft. The Mariners offered Yastrzemski a $300,000 signing bonus, well above the suggested bonus for a player chosen in that round. Yastrzemski chose not to sign, and returned to Vanderbilt for his senior year. As a senior, Yastrzemski was named All-Southeastern Conference.

Professional career

Draft and minor leagues

The Baltimore Orioles selected Yastrzemski in the 14th round (429th overall) of the 2013 MLB draft, and he signed. After signing, Yastrzemski began his professional career with the Aberdeen IronBirds of the Class A-Short Season New York–Penn League (NY-P), where he had a .273 batting average, three home runs, and 25 runs batted in (RBIs). He was an NYP mid-season All Star, and appeared in the NY-P all-star game.

Yastrzemski began the 2014 season with the Delmarva Shorebirds of the Class A South Atlantic League (SAL), where he led the league with 10 triples and  batted .306/.365/.554 (5th in the league) with 10 home runs and 44 RBIs. He was an SAL mid-season All Star, and  appeared in the SAL all-star game. After the all-star game, he was promoted to the Frederick Keys of the Class A-Advanced Carolina League, where he batted .312 in 93 at-bats. He was then promoted again, to the Bowie Baysox of the Class AA Eastern League. Between Frederick and Bowie, Yastrzemski combined to bat .288 with 14 home runs, 18 stolen bases in 24 attempts, and 18 triples, which led all of Minor League Baseball. He was an MiLB Orioles organization All Star.

Yastrzemski spent the 2015 season with Bowie, where he batted .246 with six home runs and 59 RBIs. He was a 2015 Eastern League All Star. He spent 2016 with both Bowie and the Norfolk Tides of the Class AAA International League, where he posted combined statistics of a .234 batting average, with 13 home runs, and 59 RBIs.

Yastrzemski underwent surgery after the 2016 season and was not healthy for the beginning of the 2017 season. During the 2017 season, he was with the Tides for 81 games between May and September, except for several weeks in June and July when he played 20 games with the Baysox. He returned to Norfolk in 2018. He was an MiLB Orioles organization All Star.

The Orioles invited Yastrzemski to spring training as a non-roster player in 2019.

San Francisco Giants (2019–present)

2019
On March 22, 2019, the Orioles traded Yastrzemski to the San Francisco Giants in exchange for minor league pitcher Tyler Herb. He was assigned to the Sacramento River Cats of the Class AAA Pacific Coast League to start the 2019 season, for whom he batted .316/.414/.676 with 38 runs, 12 home runs and 25 RBIs in 136 at bats.

The Giants promoted Yastrzemski to the Major Leagues on May 25, 2019, and he made his debut the same day, going 0-for-3 with a run scored in a 10–4 loss to the Arizona Diamondbacks. He collected his first career hit, a single, the following day but was thrown out returning to first base and went 3-for-4 with a run scored in the Giants' 6–2 loss. Yastrzemski hit his first career home run against his former organization, the Baltimore Orioles, off Andrew Cashner on May 31. On August 16, he hit three home runs against the Arizona Diamondbacks at Chase Field, including the game-winning home run in the top of the 11th inning. On September 17, he hit his 20th home run, a solo shot to the center field bleachers, in his first game at Fenway Park, where his grandfather played his entire 23-year MLB career. The Giants won 7–6.

For the 2019 season, Yastrzemski played in 107 games while batting .272/.334/.518 with 21 home runs, 55 RBIs, and 64 runs scored in 371 at bats. His 21 home runs tied Kevin Pillar for the most on the team. He was the first rookie since Dave Kingman in 1972 to hit more than 20 home runs for the Giants.

2020

On September 9, 2020, he hit his 30th home run in his 151st game. Yastrzemski joined Bobby Thomson and Dave Kingman as the only other Giants to hit 30 home runs so quickly in their careers.

Yastrzemski finished the pandemic-shortened 2020 season batting .297/.400/.568 with 10 home runs and leading the team in RBIs with 35. He led the NL in triples (4) and range factor/9 IP as a right fielder (2.38), and was 8th in OPS (.968), 9th in doubles (14), and 10th in OBP (.400).

Yastrzemski received All-MLB second team honors for his performance during the season. He was 8th in voting for NL MVP.

2021
On June 15, 2021, at Oracle Park, in a 9-8 win over the Arizona Diamondbacks, with the Giants trailing 8-5 in the eighth inning with two outs and having earlier trailed 7-0, Yastrzemski hit his first career grand slam, a go-ahead home run off of Humberto Castellanos into McCovey Cove for a "Splash Hit".

In the 2021 regular season, Yastrzemski batted .224/.311/.457 with 28 doubles, 25 home runs, and 71 RBIs in 468 at bats. He had a 2.26 range factor per 9 innings as a right fielder, leading the National League for the second season in a row. His salary was $600,000.

He was one of three nominees for a National League Gold Glove Award in right field, ultimately losing to Adam Duvall.

2022
In 2022, Yastrzemski batted .214/.305/.392 in 485 at bats, with 73 runs, 31 doubles (a career high), 17 home runs, and 57 RBIs, stealing five bases in six attempts. He played 104 games in right field, 93 games in center field, and one game at DH. In November, Yastrzemski and the Giants agreed on a one-year contract for the 2023 season of $6.1 million.

Personal life
Yastrzemski grew up in Andover, Massachusetts. His father, Carl Jr. (who went by Mike), played college baseball for the Florida State Seminoles baseball team, and played professionally in the minor leagues from 1984 to 1988. His father and mother, Anne-Marie, divorced when he was six years old. Carl Jr. died in 2004 at the age of 43 from a blood clot after having hip surgery. His grandfather, Carl Yastrzemski, is a member of the National Baseball Hall of Fame and began teaching young Mike hitting during his grandson’s freshman year in high school.

Yastrzemski married Paige (Cahill) Yastrzemski  in November 2018. They have one child, a daughter.

References

External links

1990 births
Living people
Aberdeen IronBirds players
American people of Polish descent
Baseball players from Massachusetts
Bowie Baysox players
Delmarva Shorebirds players
Frederick Keys players
Major League Baseball outfielders
Norfolk Tides players
People from Andover, Massachusetts
Sacramento River Cats players
San Francisco Giants players
Vanderbilt Commodores baseball players
Cotuit Kettleers players
Sportspeople from Essex County, Massachusetts